The George Cinema is a former Art Deco cinema on Bath Street in Portobello, Edinburgh. The building opened in 1939 as the County Cinema. For many years a bingo hall, it is a Category C listed building.

History 
The Grand Opening Ceremony, performed by Bailie Edward took place on Thursday, 30 March in 1939 at 2.30pm, and the feature film of the opening programme was Snow White and the Seven Dwarfs.  The George was the first cinema in the east of Scotland to use the four-track stereophonic sound with a wide screen. The system required 32 loud-speakers in the cinema, 16 of which were behind the screen.  

The George Cinema was designed by Thomas Bowhill Gibson, also responsible for the Dominion Cinema in Morningside, Edinburgh.  The promoters were Messrs Scott Paulo & Company  The cost of the cinema was £20,000 and upon opening it seated 1600 people. The cinema featured wide knee-room, saucer shape layout ensuring no seat is immediately behind another, Western Electric Mirrophonic sound and Holophone lighting system.

The George Cinema was to be demolished under a planning application for 20 privately owned flats. The City of Edinburgh Planning Authority refused consent to demolish the art deco cinema. An appeal was lodged in April 2018 by the developer, with an inspection to be made by the Reporter on 13 August 2018. Fresh proposals for redevelopment were submitted in early 2021, and these were opposed by local Councillors.

References

External links
Save the George campaign

Cinemas in Edinburgh
Portobello, Edinburgh
Category C listed buildings in Edinburgh